Ianis Alin Zicu (born 23 October 1983) is a Romanian former professional footballer who played as a midfielder for teams such as Dinamo București, Farul Constanța, Rapid București, Politehnica Timișoara, CSKA Sofia or ASA Târgu Mureș, among others.

Personal life
Ianis Zicu is an ethnic Aromanian.

Club career

Dinamo București 
Zicu made his Divizia A debut on 14 April 2001, at the age of 17 in a 4–2 win over Gaz Metan Mediaș. He scored his first goal in a 4–3 loss to Astra Ploiești in the 2000–01 season. However, Zicu found first-team opportunities limited, during his four years at the club he was loaned out several times to gain more experience. During his time at the club, Zicu won the Romania league titles twice in 2002 and 2004, the Romanian Cup in 2001, 2004, and 2005 and the Romanian Supercup in 2005.

Internazionale 
In January 2004 Zicu joined Internazionale, but club sent him immediately on a loan spell to Parma, as part of the Adriano Leite Ribeiro deal.

Loaned out 
Zicu made his Serie A debut for Parma on 21 February 2004 in a 2–1 win against Sampdoria. He was loaned back to Dinamo București in January 2005. Upon his return, Zicu won his second Romanian Cup in 2005. He remained in his country on loan to Rapid București, and would become the team's leading scorer. He added 1 more domestic cup with Rapid in 2007. However, the following season he went back to Dinamo on a permanent deal.

Politehnica Timișoara 
On 21 July 2010, Zicu signed a five-year contract with archrivals FC Timișoara. He made his debut in the Europa League, in the second leg of the third qualifying round against MyPa. He scored the second goal in the 80th minute, MyPa were leading 3–0 at half time. Timișoara had completed an amazing comeback during the second half a stoppage-time equaliser from Marián Čišovský in the 90+2' minute gave Poli the tickets to the competition's play-offs. After the first half of the season, Zicu scored 9 times in 15 matches. He scored twice in the second half of the season against Gaz Metan Mediaș in a 3–1 win. He dedicated his goals to his mother, who had died three weeks earlier of breast cancer. On 5 March 2011, Zicu netted again in a 2–1 away win against CFR Cluj at the Dr. Constantin Rădulescu Stadium. He scored again this time against Universitatea Craiova, in a 4–0 win, and then in a 2–0 victory over Victoria Brănești, becoming the Liga 1 top scorer with 18 goals.

CSKA Sofia 
On 16 June 2011, Zicu moved abroad to sign with Bulgarian club CSKA Sofia for 3 years. On 30 July he made his competitive debut for CSKA in the Bulgarian Supercup derby match against Litex Lovech. He scored from penalty and made the result 2-1 for CSKA, afterwards the match ended 3-1 and CSKA Sofia won the Supercup for the record fourth time in their history. On 28 October 2011, Zicu scored the only goal in the Eternal derby of Bulgaria to help CSKA to a 1:0 home win over Levski Sofia. He scored his first-ever hat-trick in his career on 12 November 2011, in a 3–1 home win over Minyor Pernik. Zicu finished the first half of the 2011–12 A PFG season as the top scorer in the league, having netted 13 times in total.

Pohang Steelers 
In late December 2011, it was revealed that Zicu had been transferred to South Korean club Pohang Steelers, signing a two-year deal with an option for a fourth year (a two-year extension) for an undisclosed fee, though media reports estimated it to be €2.3 million. He made his official debut as a starter on 18 February 2012 in the 2–0 win over Thai club Chonburi FC in an AFC Champions League match and scored his first goal for the team on 11 March 2012, in the 1–1 away draw with Gwangju FC in a K-League game. He scored 6 goals in 15 appearances for Pohang Steelers and won the 2012 Korean FA Cup with them.

Gangwon FC 
On 24 July 2012, he agreed to join the K League side Gangwon FC on a 6-month loan deal until the end of the 2012 season.

In January 2013, Zicu was transferred definitely to Gangwon FC, where he scored 15 goals for Gangwon FC in the K-League.

Petrolul Ploiești 
On 15 January 2014, Zicu signed a contract for one year and a half with the team from Ploiești, after Adrian Mutu signed one day before with the club. He chose to wear the number 27, the number that he wore at FC Politehnica Timișoara, when he became the top scorer of Liga I. He ended his contract after only half a season.

ASA Târgu Mureș 
In July 2014, he moved to the newly promoted ASA Târgu Mureș, where he signed a contract for one season. He scored 5 goals in 30 games, helping his team to a second place in the league.

International career
He was an under-21 international before he made his debut for the senior side in 2003. He was banned from representing his country at any level for two years in 2004.

Zicu made his senior debut for Romania in a friendly with Japan on 11 October 2003.

Career statistics

Club

International

Statistics accurate as of match played on 26 September 2011

International goals

Honours

Club
Dinamo București
Divizia A : 2001–02, 2003–04
Cupa României : 2000–01, 2003–04, 2004–05
Supercupa României : 2005

Rapid București
Cupa României : 2006–07

CSKA Sofia
Bulgarian Supercup : 2011

Pohang Steelers
Korean FA Cup : 2012

Individual
Liga I top scorer: 2010–11

References

External links
 
 
 
 
 
 

1983 births
Living people
Sportspeople from Constanța
Aromanian sportspeople
Romanian people of Aromanian descent
Romanian footballers
Romania international footballers
Romania under-21 international footballers
Romania youth international footballers
Romanian expatriate footballers
FC Dinamo București players
FCV Farul Constanța players
Inter Milan players
Parma Calcio 1913 players
FC Rapid București players
FC Politehnica Timișoara players
FCM Câmpina players
PFC CSKA Sofia players
Pohang Steelers players
Gangwon FC players
FC Petrolul Ploiești players
ASA 2013 Târgu Mureș players
ACS Poli Timișoara players
Liga I players
Liga II players
Serie A players
First Professional Football League (Bulgaria) players
K League 1 players
Expatriate footballers in Italy
Expatriate footballers in Bulgaria
Expatriate footballers in South Korea
Romanian expatriate sportspeople in South Korea
Association football midfielders
Romanian football managers
FCV Farul Constanța managers
FC Unirea Constanța managers
CS Concordia Chiajna managers